L'Équilibre is the second album recorded by French singer Emmanuel Moire. It was released on 13 April 2009.  Three tracks from the album were released as singles – "Adulte & Sexy", "Sans dire un mot" & "Promis"

Track listing
(All songs co-written by Yann Guillon and Emmanuel Moire, except for "Habillez-moi" cowritten by Doriand and Claire Joseph. All songs produced by Emmanuel Moire and Ninjamix)
 "Suite et fin" (5:30)
 "Adulte & sexy" (3:17)
 "Sans dire un mot" (3:34)
 "Mieux vaut toi que jamais" (3:25)
 "L'Adversaire" (4:49)
 "Dis-moi encore" (3:48)
 "Promis" (4:03)
 "Attraction" (4:16)
 "Habillez-moi" (4:36)
 "Sois tranquille" (4:43)
 "Retour à la vie" (7:42)

Charts

Weekly charts

Year-end charts

References

2009 albums
Emmanuel Moire albums